John Fayram, a portrait and landscape painter, practised in London. He died in 1744.

Life
Fayram was active before 1744.

There are by him some slight, coarse etchings of views in the neighbourhood of Chelsea and Battersea, and also one of the Hermitage in Kew Gardens. He also has a number of portraits in national collections. Many of these are of the Hervey family including Felton Hervey.

References

Attribution:
 

Year of birth unknown
1744 deaths
18th-century English painters
English male painters
18th-century English male artists